Get Along Tour was the tenth concert tour by Australian recording artist Guy Sebastian. The tour supported his sixth studio album Armageddon (2013). The tour visited metro and regional areas in Australia. Sebastian won the 2013 ARIA Award for Best Live Act for the tour.

Background
In November 2012 a five date tour of the mainland capital cities was announced for March/April 2013. The concerts in Melbourne, Sydney, Perth and Adelaide sold out in the first week, and an extra 5 concerts were added in those cities. The tour was extended to include 36 concerts in regional areas of Australia in May and June 2013. Overall there were 46 concert dates.

David Ryan Harris, an American soul musician who has co-written songs with Sebastian including "Like it Like That" and "Battle Scars", was the support act. He also played guitar in Sebastian's band on the tour. Carmen Smith, and former X-Factor contestant Angel Tupai were the backing vocalists, and both performed duets with Sebastian.

Tour personnel
 Guy Sebastian – Vocals, Guitar, and Keys
 David Ryan Harris Support Artist  – guitar and backing vocals
 Carmen Smith- Backing vocals
 Angel Tupai – Backing vocals
 Terepai Richmond – drums
 Adam Ventoura – bass
 Sam Vincent – guitar and bongo
 Wendy Anggerani – Keys
 Ludeovic Louis – trumpet and Backing vocals 
 Dan Redgrave – Tourmeister
 Anatole Day – Front of House
 Justin Arthur – Monitors
 Brett Millican – Backline Stage (tour photography)

"Special Guest appearances"
 Taylor Swift
 Johnny Ruffo

Set List

The following set list is representative of the show on 12 April 2013 at the Brisbane Convention Centre . It is not representative of all concerts for the duration of the tour.

"Amnesia"
"Beg"
"Gold"
"Attention"
"Don't Worry Be Happy / Don't You Worry Child"
"Keeper"
"Armageddon"
"Died and Gone to Heaven"
"Get Along"
"Art of Love"
"Bring Yourself"
"Sweetest Berry (feat. David Ryan Harris)"
"Big Bad World"
"Alive"
"Oh Oh"
"Who's That Girl"
"Angels Brought Me Here"
"Battle Scars"
"Bed of Clouds"
"Like It Like That / Thrift Shop"

Tour dates

References

2013 concert tours